General Surgery is a Swedish goregrind group known as one of the earliest Carcass clones. Their 1991 debut Necrology was released by Relapse Records and would be General Surgery's only material released until 2001, when the group recorded one track for the Carcass tribute album, Requiems of Revulsion. However, in 2003, General Surgery reformed and released a split album with The County Medical Examiners and have since released a collection of demos, two split 7-inches, a 2005 demo, a split album with Butcher ABC, and two full-length albums.

Current members
Joacim Carlsson – guitar (1989–1990, 2007–present)
Andreas "Adde" Mitroulis – drums, vocals  (2002–present)
Andreas Eriksson – bass, vocals  (2002–2004, 2007–present)
Erik Sahlström – vocals (2007–present)
Urban "Ubbe" Skytt – guitar (2015–present)

Former members
Jonas Derouche – guitar (1988–1989)
Grant McWilliams – bass, vocals (1988–1989, 1990)
Richard Cabeza – vocals (1988–1990, 1999–2002)
Matti Kärki – bass, drums, vocals (1988–1990)
Mats Nordrup – drums (1988–1990)
Anders Jakobson – drums (1999–2000)
Erik Thyselius – drums (2000–2001)
Chris Barkensjö – drums (2001–2002)
Glenn Sykes v bass (2004–2006)
Johan Wallin – guitar, vocals (2006–2011)
Tobias Sillman – guitar (2012–2015)

Timeline

Discography

Full length albums
2006 - Left Hand Pathology (Listenable Records)
2009 - Corpus In Extremis: Analysing Necrocriticism (Listenable Records)

EPs
1991 - Necrology (Relapse Records)
2012 - Like an Ever Flying Limb (Relapse Records)
2021 - Lay Down and Be Counted (Self-released)

Demos
1990 - Errosive Offals
1990 - Pestisferous Anthropophagia 
1990 - Internecine Prurience
2005 - Demo 2005

Split albums
2003 - General Surgery/The County Medical Examiners (Razorback Records)
2003 - Relapse Singles Series Vol. 2 (Relapse Records)
2004 - General Surgery/Filth (Bones Brigade Records)
2004 - General Surgery/Machetazo (Escorbuto Recordings/Goryfied Productions)
2009 - General Surgery/Butcher ABC (Obliteration Records/Living Dead Society)

Compilation albums
2001 - Requiems of Revulsion (Necropolis Records)
2004 - Demos (Nuclear Abominations Records)
2012 - A Collection of Depravation (Relapse Records)

References

External links
Official General Surgery website
General Surgery at MySpace

Swedish death metal musical groups
Deathgrind musical groups
Goregrind musical groups
Relapse Records artists
Musical groups established in 1989
Musical groups from Stockholm
Listenable Records artists